The Arieșul Mare is a river in the Apuseni Mountains, Alba County, western Romania. It is the left headwater of the river Arieș. It flows through the villages Arieșeni, Gârda de Sus, Scărișoara, Albac and Vadu Moților, and joins the Arieșul Mic (the other headwater) in Mihoești near Câmpeni.

Tributaries
The following rivers are tributaries to the river Arieșul Mare (from source to mouth):

Left: Cobleș, Gârda Seacă, Valea Starpă and Albac
Right: Vârciorog, Valea Cepelor, Bucura, Ghizghiț and Neagra

References

Rivers of Romania
Rivers of Alba County